Pudhumai Pithan is a 1957 Indian Tamil-language film directed by T. R. Ramanna and written by M. Karunanidhi, starring M. G. Ramachandran, T. R. Rajakumari and B. S. Saroja. The film was released on 2 August 1957.

Plot 
A king is imprisoned by his ambitious brother, who creates the impression that the king had died during an animal hunt. The crown prince was on a sea journey and returns to attend the king's fake funeral. During the funeral, the crown prince discovers the truth, via a secret message conveyed to him by the daughter of the palace physician. As expected, she falls in love with the prince. The sibling of king also plots to kill the prince by poisoning him with a drug, concocted by the palace physician. The drug was supposed to make the crown prince mad, who acts like a madman poisoned by the drug to fool everyone. Prince is also helped by a woman drama troupe leader, who also had affection to the crown prince. Eventually, she sacrifices her life, leaving the prince to unite with the daughter of palace physician. The plotting villains were avenged by the prince and his comedian sidekick.

Cast 
Cast according to the opening credits

Male cast
 M. G. Ramachandran as Jeevagan
 T. S. Balaiah as Prathapan
 J. P. Chandrababu as Arivumani
 E. R. Sahadevan as Parakraman
 R. Balasubramaniam as Dhunmuki
 C. S. Pandian as Chitraguptan
 P. S. Venkatachalam as Veeraiah
 C. V. V. Panthulu as Emperor
 C.R.Parthibhan as Nallannan (Brother of Inbavalli)

Female cast
 T. R. Rajakumari as Inbavalli
 B. S. Saroja as Velvizhi
 E. V. Saroja as Aprajitha
 K. S. Angamuthu as Poonkodi
Supporting cast
 Shantha, Rita, Jayanthi, Kamala, Vitto Bai, Shanthi, Chandra, Bala, Thara, Mohana, Janaki, Saroja, Rajeswari, Rukkumani, Leela, Ranganayaki, Saraswathi and Prema.

Production 
The film was directed by Ramanna and it was produced by K. Muniratnam under the banner Sivakami Pictures. The film's script was written by M. Karunanidhi and the cinematography was handled by G. Ramu. According to historian M. L. Narasimham, it was partly inspired by William Shakespeare's Hamlet.

Soundtrack 
The music was composed by G. Ramanathan. All lyrics were by Thanjai N. Ramaiah Dass..

Release 
Kanthan of Kalki wrote . Historian Randor Guy wrote that the film failed because of the "predictable storyline".

References

External links 
 

1950s Tamil-language films
1957 films
Films about royalty
Films directed by T. R. Ramanna
Films scored by G. Ramanathan